Arlington Asset Investment Corp. is a mortgage real estate investment trust headquartered in McLean, Virginia.

The company is an investment firm that focuses primarily on investing in mortgage related assets and residential real estate.  The company's investment capital is currently allocated between the following assets classes:
 - mortgage servicing right ("MSR") related assets
 - credit investments
 - single family residential ("SFR") properties
 - agency mortgage-backed security ("MBS")

The company's MSR related assets represent investments for which the return is based on the economic performance of a pool of specific MSRs.  An MSR provides a mortgage servicer with the right to service a pool of residential mortgage loans in exchange for a portion of the interest payments made on underlying residential mortgage loans.  The Company's credit investments generally include investments in mortgage loans secured by either residential or commercial real property or MBS collateralized by residential or commercial mortgage loans ("non-agency MBS") or asset-backed security ("ABS") collateralized by residential solar panel loans.  The company's SFR investment strategy is to acquire, lease and operate single-family residential homes as rental properties. 
The company's agency MBS consist of residential pass-through certificates for which the principal and interest payments are guaranteed by a U.S. government sponsored enterprise ("GSE"), such as Fannie Mae or Freddie Mac.

History
The company was founded as Friedman, Billings, Ramsey Group Inc. in 1989 by Emmanuel Friedman, Eric Billings, and Russ Ramsey.

In 1997, the company became a public company via an initial public offering, raising $206 million.

Ramsey left the company in 2001. Following the early 2000s recession, FBR Group invested heavily in subprime mortgages. During the subprime mortgage crisis, the company incurred severe losses related to its underperforming mortgage origination platform and widespread problems in subprime mortgage lending, which led to a sale of ownership in FBR's subprime subsidiary, First NLC Financial Services, in the summer of 2007.

Friedman left FBR Group in 2005.

In June 2007, FBR Capital Markets was formed through a corporate spin-off from FBR Group.

From its founding through 2008, FBR Group was taxed as a real estate investment trust. Starting in 2009, the company converted to a C corporation to use its net operating loss carry-forwards and net capital loss carry-forwards to shield substantially all of its income from income taxes.

In May 2009, FBR Group sold a portion of its investment in FBR Capital Markets for $72.5 million. In October 2009, the remaining investment in FBR Capital Markets was sold for $84.1 million.

In June 2009, the company changed its name to Arlington Asset Investment Corp.

In June 2014, Eric Billings stepped down as CEO and J. Rock Tonkel, Jr. was appointed CEO, with Billings continuing as Executive Chairman. Tonkel previously served as the company's President and Chief Operating Officer.

Effective in 2019, the company converted back to a real estate investment trust after it had used its net operating loss carry-forwards.

Effective December 31, 2019, Eric Billings retired.

Starting in 2020, the company began to transition the company from primarily a levered agency MBS strategy to one focused on multiple investment channels in mortgage servicing rights, single-family residential rental properties, credit investments and agency MBS.

Sponsorship
The company sponsored the Phoenix Open PGA golf tournament held in Scottsdale, Arizona from 2004 until 2009.

References

External links
 
 

1989 establishments in Washington, D.C.
1997 initial public offerings
Companies based in Arlington County, Virginia
Companies listed on the New York Stock Exchange
Financial services companies established in 1989
Investment management companies of the United States
Mortgage-backed security
Real estate investment trusts of the United States